Zau de Câmpie (Hungarian pronunciation:) is a commune in Mureș County, Transylvania, Romania composed of nine villages:

The commune lies in the Transylvanian Plain. It is located in the western part of the county,  from the town of Luduș. Zau de Câmpie borders the following communes: Șăulia and Papiu Ilarian to the east, Valea Largă to the west, Miheșu de Câmpie to the north, and Tăureni to the south.

It has a population of 3,509: 80% Romanians, 11% Roma and 9% Hungarians.

The Zau de Câmpie gas field lies within the perimeter of the commune.

See also
List of Hungarian exonyms (Mureș County)

References

Communes in Mureș County
Localities in Transylvania